Andrej Stojaković (born August 17, 2004) is a Serbian-Greek high school basketball player who attends Jesuit High School in Sacramento. He is the eldest child of former professional basketball player Peja Stojaković.

High school career 
Stojaković attends Jesuit High School in Sacramento, California. As a junior, Stojaković averaged 25.3 points, 9.3 rebounds, and 1.4 steals per game in 26 games.  On January 24, 2023, Stojaković was selected as a McDonald's All-American.

Recruiting
Stojaković is considered a four-star recruit in the 2023 class by 247Sports, ESPN and Rivals. He received offers from many NCAA Division I programs, including Kentucky, UCLA, Texas, Indiana, Florida, Louisville, Stanford, Tennessee, Oregon, UConn, and Georgia Tech among others. Stojaković verbally committed to Stanford on November 7, 2022.

National team career 
Due to his father's background, Stojaković is eligible to represent Serbia internationally, while due to his mother's background he is eligible to represent Greece.

Personal life 
Stojaković is a son of Serbian former basketball player Peja Stojaković and Greek model Aleka Kamila. His father is a three-time NBA All-Star with the Sacramento Kings and 2011 NBA Champion with the Dallas Mavericks.

References

External links
 Andrej Stojakovic at 247Sports
 Andrej Stojakovic at Rivals.com

2004 births
Living people
Basketball players from Thessaloniki
Basketball players from California
Greek men's basketball players
Greek expatriate basketball people in the United States
Greek people of Serbian descent
McDonald's High School All-Americans
Serbian men's basketball players
Serbian expatriate basketball people in the United States
Serbian people of Greek descent
Shooting guards